West India Lights is a collection of fantasy and horror short stories by American writer  Henry S. Whitehead.  It was released in 1946 and was the second collection of the author's stories to be published by Arkham House.  It was published in an edition of 3,037 copies.

Most of the stories had originally appeared in the magazines Weird Tales, Strange Tales, and Amazing Stories.

Contents

West India Lights contains the following tales:

 "Black Terror"
 "West India Lights"
 "'Williamson'"
 "The Shut Room"
 "The Left Eye"
 "Tea Leaves"
 "The Trap" (with H.P. Lovecraft)
 "The Napier Limousine"
 "The Ravel Pavane"
 "Sea Change"
 "The People of Pan"
 "The Chadbourne Episode"
 "Scar Tissue"
 "'—In Case of Disaster Only'"
 "Bothon" (with H.P. Lovecraft)
 "The Great Circle"
 "Obi in the Caribbean"

Sources

1946 short story collections
Horror short story collections
Fantasy short story collections
Arkham House books